The Froggatt Award is presented to people who have made a major contribution to protecting Australia's native plants and animals, ecosystems, and people from dangerous new invasive species.

The Froggatt Awards are named in honour of Australian entomologist Walter Froggatt, who, when the cane toad was released into Australia in the 1930s to control beetle infestations in the sugar cane industry, was a lone voice, lobbying the federal government to exercise caution.

History
The Froggatt Awards were first presented in 2003, by the Invasive Species Council.

From 2003 to 2006 there was only one award per year.

No awards were issued from 2007 to 2014.

From 2015 there have been multiple awards presented, one each for various categories of activity determined each year.

The original trophy was a stuffed cane toad, but is now a framed certificate.

Name
In 2006 the award was temporarily renamed from the Froggatt Award to the Biosecure Australia Award, and renamed back to the Froggatt Award in 2015 when the awards recommenced.

The Biosecure Australia Award was to be presented annually in recognition of an outstanding contribution to the eradication, early warning, preventative action, awareness raising or management of an invasive species in Australia.

Coverage
The award received exceptionally extensive coverage within Australia, and also international coverage, when one was awarded to the Australian Federal Minister for Agriculture and Water Resources, Barnaby Joyce, in part for the Minister's action in regard to pet dogs incorrectly brought to Australia by Johnny Depp and his partner.

Recipients

2017 Froggatt Award

2015 Froggatt Award

2003–2006

Froggatt Award

Biosecure Australia Award

Notes

See also

 List of environmental awards

References

Further reading
 Invasive Species Council media releases for Froggatt Awards

External links
 Invasive Species Council

Environmental awards
Australian science and technology awards
Awards established in 2003